Microsepsis is a genus of flies in the family Sepsidae.

Species
Microsepsis armillata (Melander, & Spuler, 1917)
Microsepsis currani (Ozerov, 1993)
Microsepsis fulva (Ozerov, 1994)
Microsepsis furcata (Melander, & Spuler, 1917)
Microsepsis limnetica (Ozerov, 1993)
Microsepsis mitis (Curran, 1927)
Microsepsis pilosicoxa (Ozerov, 1993)
Microsepsis stenoptera Silva, 1993
Microsepsis steyskali (Ozerov, 1993)

References

Sepsidae
Diptera of North America
Diptera of South America
Brachycera genera